2014 was the first year in the history of Kunlun Fight, a kickboxing promotion based in China. 2015 started with Kunlun Fight 1 and ended with Kunlun Fight 14.

The events were broadcasts through a television agreement with Qinghai Television.

Champions

List of events

70 kg World Max Tournament 2014 bracket

Kunlun Fight 1 

Results

67 kg tournament bracket

Kunlun Fight 2 / Wu Lin Feng 2014 / MAX Muaythai 6

Results

80 kg tournament bracket

Kunlun Fight 3

Results

Female 52 kg tournament bracket

Kunlun Fight 4

Results

95kg tournament bracket

Kunlun Fight 5

Results

70 kg tournament bracket

Kunlun Fight 6

Results

100kg tournament bracket

Kunlun Fight 7

Results

Kunlun Fight 8

Results

75kg tournament bracket

Kunlun Fight 9

Results

Female 60kg tournament bracket

Kunlun Fight 10 / Topking World Series: TK1

Results

95kg tournament bracket

Kunlun Fight 11

Results

Kunlun Fight 12

Results

65kg tournament bracket

Kunlun Fight 13

Results

Kunlun Fight 14

Results

See also
List of Kunlun Fight events
2014 in Glory

References

External links

2014 in kickboxing
Kickboxing in China
Kunlun Fight events
2014 in Chinese sport